William Fisher Polygonal Barn, also known as the Fisher-Dykes Barn, is a historic 10-sided barn located in Sugar Creek Township, Montgomery County, Indiana. It was built in 1914, and is a two-story, balloon frame structure on a concrete foundation.  Two of the 10 sides are 28 feet wide, while the 8 remaining sides are 16 feet wide.  The barn is topped by a sectional two-pitched gambrel roof with flared eaves.  Atop the roof is a six-sided cupola.

It was listed on the National Register of Historic Places in 1993.

References

Round barns in Indiana
Barns on the National Register of Historic Places in Indiana
Buildings and structures completed in 1914
Buildings and structures in Montgomery County, Indiana
National Register of Historic Places in Montgomery County, Indiana
1914 establishments in Indiana